Dehgah or Deh Gah or Deh-e Gah, also rendered as Dehga, may refer to:
 Deh Gah, Chaharmahal and Bakhtiari
 Deh Gah, Farashband, Fars Province
 Dehgah, Firuzabad, Fars Province
 Dehgah, Kazerun, Fars Province
 Deh Gah, Rostam, Fars Province
 Dehgah, Sepidan, Fars Province
 Dehgah, Astaneh-ye Ashrafiyeh, Gilan Province
 Dehgah, Dehshal, Astaneh-ye Ashrafiyeh County, Gilan Province
 Dehgah, Siahkal, Gilan Province
 Deh Gah, Andika, Khuzestan Province
 Dehgah, Dezful, Khuzestan Province
 Deh Gah, Masjed Soleyman, Khuzestan Province
 Dehgah-e Gaheshlun, Dezful County, Khuzestan Province
 Dehgah-e Tapi, Dezful County, Khuzestan Province
 Dehgah 2, Izeh County, Khuzestan Province
 Dehgah-e Lalmir, Izeh County, Khuzestan Province
 Deh Gah, Kohgiluyeh and Boyer-Ahmad
 Dehgah, Aligudarz, Lorestan Province
 Dehgah, Borujerd, Lorestan Province
 Dehgah, Khorramabad, Lorestan Province
 Dehgah, North Khorasan
 Dehgah Rural District, in Gilan Province